Dota is a canton in the San José province of Costa Rica.  The head city of the canton is Santa María. 

It is part of Los Santos Zone, together with Tarrazú and León Cortés Castro.

History 
Dota was created on 23 July 1925 by decree 80.

Geography 
Dota has an area of  km² and a mean elevation of  metres.

The canton is delineated by the Savegre River on the south and southeast, the Naranjo River on the west and the Cordillera de Talamanca on the north and northeast.

Districts 
The canton of Dota is subdivided into the following districts:
 Santa María
 Jardín
 Copey

Demographics 

For the 2011 census, Dota had a population of  inhabitants.

Transportation

Road transportation 
The canton is covered by the following road routes:

References 

Cantons of San José Province
Populated places in San José Province